John Floyd was a college basketball coach. He was the head coach of Texas A&M from 1950 to 1955. He coached Texas A&M to a 38-82 record, winning one Southwest Conference championship and one NCAA tournament appearance.

Head coaching record

Date of birth unknown
Date of death unknown
American men's basketball coaches
Little Rock Trojans men's basketball coaches
Texas A&M Aggies men's basketball coaches